The Ipswich Steam Navigation Company (ISN) was founded in 1824 and provided a steamship service to London and Harwich, with occasional voyages to the Netherlands. The company went into liquidation in 1953.

In 1852 the ISN partnered with the Eastern Union Railway following the introduction of excessive fares by the Eastern Counties Railway for passengers from East Anglia who wished to complete the journey to London on their railway line from Colchester. The service went from Ipswich to Blackwall and took up to ten hours. However the provision of toilets and refreshments made this option more attractive at a time when these were not generally available on train services.

References

Companies based in Ipswich
British companies established in 1824
British companies disestablished in 1953
Navigation organizations
Defunct shipping companies of the United Kingdom
Shipping companies of England